Matthew "Matt" Tolfrey is an English DJ, producer, and label owner.  He currently owns and operates four labels:  Leftroom, Leftroom Limited, Leftout, and Is This, and he is a prominent international DJ/producer; most recently securing a spot on Resident Advisor's Top 100 DJ Poll for 2011 and 2012.

Career
Matt Tolfrey was born in England but raised on the small island country of Bahrain.

At age 16, Tolfrey returned to the UK earning a slot playing in a Worcester bar honing his mixing skills in the company of a live audience.  Later Tolfrey started at Nottingham Trent University, where in his first year he was given a show on the Nottingham radio station, Fly FM. Since the shows inception three years ago, 'Junk Funk' has gone on to win the station's best newcomer award and has seen Tolfrey promoted to head of night-time DJs.

Mirroring his success on the airwaves, Tolfrey also began gaining popularity around the clubscene.  2002 saw Tolfrey gain increased support from local independent record shop Funky Monkey, and also from underground club The Bomb who have been instrumental in organising exclusive guest slots from top name DJs such as Craig Richards, Jay Tripwire and Dave Congreve.  Tolfrey soon acquired residencies at notable clubs The Bomb, Stealth, and also became the youngest DJ to ever play at Fabric on a Saturday.

Wanting to be involved more in the other aspects of dance music, Tolfrey dived into production work.  Beginning his work through the moniker Out-ed, Tolfrey gained success through his initial releases and was later invited by reputable label, Crosstown Rebels for production releases.  Through his enthusiasm for electronic music and interest in experimentation, Tolfrey started his own label, Leftroom in 2005. Tolfrey sought after an avenue to release his peer's music and open up opportunities for friends that he believed in.  The first release was entitled The Extended Family EP encapsulating the spirit of Leftroom, a place where a core set of artists could grow and experiment with their sound.  After remarkable success with the first few releases and securing a home-grown and exceptional roster Tolfrey was asked to commence a label night at T Bar, London's hub of creativity in the house and techno scene.  Expanding on the idea of Leftroom, Tolfrey put forth two sub-labels to the Leftroom family: Leftroom Limited has the purpose of releasing peak-time records while Leftout is a home for lesser known artists who deserve some attention. In 2012 Matt Tolfrey put out his first full-length album Word of Mouth on Leftroom Records. 'Word of Mouth' has since gained popular reviews from many highly respected electronic music enthusiasts.

Discography

Albums
2012:  Word of Mouth, Leftroom

Compilations
2007:  Don't Be Leftout, Leftroom 
2011:  One, 1Trax
2012:  Classic Through The Eyes Of.. Matt Tolfrey, Leftroom

Original Music
2005:  The Horn/Acix w/ Craig Sylvester, Crosstown Rebels
2006:  Popeye/Spinach Disko w/ Craig Sylvester, Leftroom Limited
2006:  Are We Family, Leftroom
2007:  Enter The Mad Hat and Shakil w/ Inxec and Craig Sylvester, Leftroom Limited
2008:  Misunderstood w/ Glimpse, Glimpse Recordings
2009:  Even in Hollywood w/ Inxec, Culprit
2009:  Decisions w/ Inxec, Murmur
2009:  Babygirl w/ MarcAshken, Saved
2009:  Bounce for Me w/ D. Ramirez, Phonica
2009:  What Am I Buyin w/ Delete, Viva
2009:  Mile 569 EP w/ Inxec, Murmur
2009:  I Just Can't (Take It) w/ Inxec, Cocoon
2010:  Almost There w/ Inxec, Rekids
2010:  Hollywood Revisited w/ Inxec, Culprit
2010:  Real Talk w/ Inxec, Murmur
2011:  Drop The Bomb w/ Lazaro Casanova, Get Physical
2011:  Bring It On w/ Inxec, Murmur
2011:  In Excess w/ Inxec, Leftroom Limited
2011:  Hollywood @ Night w/ Christopher Sylvester, 1Trax
2011:  Who's The Freak, Get Physical
2011:  Candy w/ Lee Curtiss, Culprit
2011:  Bromance w/ Eric Johnston, Leftroom
2012:  The Same Page EP w/ Kate Simko, Leftroom
2012:  LAX EP w/ Lazaro Casanova, Nikko Gibler, Culprit
2012:  Turn You Out feat Ya Kid K, Leftroom

Remixes
2005:  Gehts Noch w/ Craig Sylvester, Skint
2005:  Bus Driver w/ Craig Sylvester, Perc Trax
2006:  Seal Clubbing w/ Craig Sylvester, Renaissance
2006:  Gone Long Gone w/ Craig Sylvester, TCP
2006:  Ken The Men w/ Craig Sylvester, Punch Funk
2007:  Alcoolic w / Inxec, CR2
2007:  Tewa w/ Inxec, Ransom Note
2007:  Shtootsh w/ MarcAshken, Frankie
2007:  The Whole Room Dematerialised w/ Inxec, Kismet
2007:  You Aint Got Time To Think w/ Inxec, Fourt:Twenty
2008:  Crash This Car w/ MarcAshken, Leftroom
2008:  Down Seq w/ Inxec, Leftroom Limited
2008:  X, Y and Z w/ MarcAshken, Leftroom Limited
2008:  Escalator w/ Inxec, NRK
2008:  Let’s Take Drugs w/ Inxec, Yoshitoshi
2009:  Really Luv Ya w/ Inxec, Get Physical
2009:  Wider Pro w/ MarcAshken, MagicBag
2009:  Nice One w/ Inxec, Bla Bla
2009:  One More Tune w/ Inxec, Renaissance
2009:  Pins N Needles w/ Inxec, Fondation
2009:  Quantum w/ Inxec, Sound Of Acapulco
2010:  Frankfurt w/ Inxec, Metroline Limited
2010:  Mirrors w/Inxec, Wiggle
2012:  Elastik Phone w/ Sam Russo, Underbelly Records
2012:  Confetti w/ Sam Russo, 1Trax
2012:  Street Talk w/ Sam Russo, Off Recordings
2012:  Classic Through The Eyes Of.. Matt Tolfrey, Classic Music Company
2012:  Right On, Right On, Soma
2012:  Intentions w/ Sam Russo, Leftroom

See also
 Artist Profile

References

English DJs
English record producers
Living people
Year of birth missing (living people)